The pronunciation of the digraph  in English has changed over time, and still varies today between different regions and accents. The process by which the historical  has become  in most modern varieties of English is called the wine–whine merger. It is also referred to as glide cluster reduction.

(A similar sound change occurred earlier in the word how.)

Early history

What is now English  originated as the Proto-Indo-European consonant *kʷ (whose reflexes came to be written  in Latin and the Romance languages). In the Germanic languages, in accordance with Grimm's Law, Indo-European voiceless stops became voiceless fricatives in most environments. Thus the labialized velar stop *kʷ initially became presumably a labialized velar fricative *xʷ in pre-Proto-Germanic, then probably becoming  – a voiceless labio-velar approximant – in Proto-Germanic proper. The sound was used in Gothic and represented by the letter hwair.

As a result, such words are often called wh-words, and questions formed from them are called wh-questions. In reference to this English order, a common cross-lingual grammatical phenomenon affecting interrogative words is called wh-movement.

Developments before rounded vowels
Therefore, words with an established  in that position came to be perceived (and spelt) as beginning with plain . This occurred with the interrogative word how (Proto-Germanic *hwō, Old English hū).

A similar process of labialization of  before rounded vowels occurred in the Middle English period, around the 15th century, in some dialects. Some words which historically began with  came to be written  (whole, whore). This process affected the pronoun who and its inflected forms.
 who – Old English hwā, Modern English 
 whom – Old English hwǣm, Modern English 
 whose – Old English hwās, Modern English 

By contrast with how, these words changed after their spelling with  had become established, and thus continue to be written with  like the other interrogative words which, what, etc. (which were not affected by the above changes since they had unrounded vowels – the vowel of what became rounded at a later time).

Wine–whine merger

John C. Wells refers to this process as Glide Cluster Reduction. This merger has taken place in the dialects of the great majority of English speakers.

Extent of the merger 
The merger seems to have been present in the south of England as early as the 13th century. It was unacceptable in educated speech until the late 18th century, but there is no longer generally any stigma attached to either pronunciation. In the late nineteenth century, Alexander John Ellis found that /hw/ was retained in all wh- words throughout Cumbria, Northumberland, Scotland and the Isle of Man, but the distinction was largely absent throughout the rest of England.

The merger is essentially complete in England, Wales, the West Indies, South Africa, Australia, and in the speech of young speakers in New Zealand.

The merger is not found in Scotland, most of Ireland (although the distinction is usually lost in Belfast and some other urban areas of Northern Ireland), and in the speech of older speakers in New Zealand. The distribution of the wh- sound in words does not always exactly match the standard spelling; for example, Scots pronounce whelk with plain , while in many regions weasel has the wh- sound. 

Most speakers in the United States and Canada have the merger. According to Labov, Ash, and Boberg (2006: 49), using data collected in the 1990s, there are regions of the U.S. (particularly in the Southeast) in which speakers keeping the distinction are about as numerous as those having the merger, but there are no regions in which the preservation of the distinction is predominant (see map). Throughout the U.S. and Canada, about 83% of respondents in the survey had the merger completely, while about 17% preserved at least some trace of the distinction.

Possible homophones
Below is a list of word pairs which are liable to be pronounced as homophones by speakers having the wine–whine merger.

Pronunciations and phonological analysis of the distinct wh sound 
As mentioned above, the sound of initial , when distinguished from plain , is often pronounced as a voiceless labio-velar approximant , a voiceless version of the ordinary  sound.

In some dialects of Scots, the sequence  has merged with the voiceless labiodental fricative . Thus whit ("what") is pronounced , whan ("when") becomes , and whine becomes  (a homophone of fine). This is also found in some Irish English with an Irish Gaelic substrate influence (which has led to a re-borrowing of whisk(e)y as Irish Gaelic , the word having originally entered English from Scottish Gaelic).

When it has the pronunciation , however, it may also be analyzed as a single phoneme,

In popular culture 

 A portrayal of the regional retention of the distinct wh- sound is found in the speech of the character Frank Underwood, a South Carolina politician, in the American television series House of Cards. 
 The show King of the Hill, set in Texas, pokes fun at the issue through character Hank Hill's use of the hypercorrected  pronunciation. 
 A similar gag can be found in several episodes of Family Guy, with Brian becoming annoyed by Stewie's over-emphasis of the  sound in his pronunciation of "Cool hWhip", "hWheat Thins", and "Wil hWheaton".

See also

 Phonological history of English consonants
 Phonological history of English consonant clusters

References

Splits and mergers in English phonology
Scots language